St. Louis Blues is a 1958 album by Nat King Cole, arranged by Nelson Riddle. St. Louis Blues was the soundtrack to the film of the same name that starred Cole. The Billboard album chart placed the disc at a peak position of #18.

Track listing
 Overture (Introducing Love Theme)/"Hesitating Blues" – 3:08
 "Harlem Blues" – 1:51
 "Chantez Les Bas" – 2:35
 "Friendless Blues" (Mercedes Gilbert) – 3:15
 "Stay" (Andy Razaf) – 2:37
 "Joe Turner's Blues" (Walter Hirsch) – 2:40
 "Beale Street Blues" – 2:56
 "Careless Love" (Martha E. Koenig, Spencer Williams) – 2:44
 "Morning Star" (Mack David, W.C. Handy) – 2:12
 "Memphis Blues" (George A. Norton) – 3:06
 "Yellow Dog Blues" – 3:16
 "St. Louis Blues" – 2:27

All music and lyrics by W.C. Handy, other lyricists indicated. Overture written by Nelson Riddle.

Personnel
 Nat King Cole – vocal
 Nelson Riddle – arranger, conductor

References

Nat King Cole albums
Albums arranged by Nelson Riddle
Capitol Records albums
1958 albums
Albums conducted by Nelson Riddle